José Antonio Aguirre Balderas (born 5 July 1975) is a Mexican former professional boxer who competed from 1995 to 2015. He held the WBC minimumweight title from 2000 to 2004.

Professional career
Aguirre was born in Cárdenas, Tabasco, Mexico.

WBC Minimumweight title
On February 11, 2000, Aguirre beat Wandee Singwangcha to win the WBC Minimumweight title, becoming the first world champion from the state of Tabasco. He successfully defended his title seven times, before losing it to Eagle Kyowa by 12 round unanimous decision on January 10, 2004.

Professional boxing record

See also
List of WBC world champions
List of Mexican boxing world champions

References

External links

1975 births
Living people
World Boxing Council champions
Mexican male boxers
Mini-flyweight boxers
World mini-flyweight boxing champions
Boxers from Tabasco
People from Cárdenas, Tabasco